The Linux Kernel Developers Summit is an annual gathering of the top Linux kernel developers.  Attendance at the summit is by invitation only, and the conference was first held in San Jose in March, 2001.  It was organized by Theodore Ts'o to provide a face to face venue for kernel developers to discuss current and future issues surrounding Linux kernel development, and was initially run by Usenix and then VA Linux's Open Source Developer's Network.   Subsequent summits from 2002 to 2006 were held the two days prior to the Ottawa Linux Symposium in Ottawa, Ontario, Canada at the same conference center with Usenix providing all of the logistical support. The 2007 Kernel Summit was held on 4–6 September 2007 at the DeVere University Arms Hotel in Cambridge, England, and was the first time the summit was moved outside of North America.

The discussions at the kernel summit have traditionally been highly technical, with a focus on issues that were not getting resolution via electronic mail.  In recent years, however, the summit has been gradually focusing more on higher level development process issues.   An example of an important development process decision made at the kernel summit was the decision to move to a rolling stable 2.6 kernel every few months, instead of the formerly used model utilizing a 1-2 year development cycle.  The Linux Technical Advisory Board is elected at a bird-of-a-feather session at the Linux Kernel Summit.

The summit usually hosts around 80 or so attendees.

References 

Linux conferences
Recurring events established in 2001